Carlo Giovanni Facetti (born 26 June 1935) is a former racing driver from Italy, mainly known for his success in touring car and sports car racing. In his single attempt at Formula One he failed to qualify for the 1974 Italian Grand Prix with a Brabham BT42 run by the Scuderia Finotto team.

In 1979 he was the European Touring Car Champion. He was also 2nd in 1977 and 4th in 1978.

Racing career
Facetti was born in Cormano, Lombardy. For nearly 40 years, he would work in his workshop and on Sunday put his race overalls and helmet and going racing. He explained his success: "We work from seven in the morning until eight at night with the sole desire to makes engines unrivaled". He learned to drive at the age of 11, with Alberto Ascari, a friend of his father, Piero Facetti, who in turn was a mechanic and a racer, who finished 4th in the 1947 Mille Miglia. His brothers, Giuliano and Rosadelle would also become racing drivers.

The early years

Carlo started racing in 1953, paired with Elio Zagato at the Giro di Calabria, using a Fiat 8V 1100, although it was Zagato bodied with Facetti prepared engines. By 1960, he was building and racing Formula Junior cars with Lancia Appia engines. "It took a lot of passion, a racing seat and reverse shift from a Fiat 600!". Despite everything, he was very fast though he had a great company: Facetti remembers at Monza he was "able to score some good times compared to those of experienced pilots such as Ludovico Scarfiotti, Lorenzo Bandini and Giancarlo Baghetti".

For 1963, he moved to touring cars to race in the inaugural European Touring Car Challenge, with Lancia's works team, HF Squadra Corse. He used a Lancia Flaminia to fight with the best from around Europe, at the circuits such as Nürburgring, Brands Hatch and Népliget Park, Budapest. It was at the later, that Facetti, paired with Luigi Cabella would score his first major international victory.  Early 1964, he return to Formula Junior racing in Argentina, in the four race Temporada series for Scuderia Sant'Ambroeus. He took their Lotus-Ford 22 to a series best of fifth place in the Gran Premio Internacional Ciudad de Buenos Aires. "I was the Italian driver to run multiple editions of the race in South America. There I had the pleasure of meeting the great Juan Manuel Fangio and later become good friends and we were often in competition in Buenos Aires and Mar del Plata."  After returning from South America, he runs a Formula Three teams with Jo Siffert and Clay Regazzoni, then participates himself in 1965. Back with Scuderia Sant'Ambroeus, he finished second the Campionato Italiano driving a Brabham-Ford BT16.

Autodelta years

Come 1969, he was employed by Autodelta, the competition department of Alfa Romeo. He was hired to help development their sportscars and race in the European Touring Car Championship. Amongst other he teamed up with was Ignazio Giunti and Nino Vaccarella. During this period, Carlo finished third in the Spa 24 Hours twice. In 1973, he was racing the team's Alfa Romeo T33/TT in the World Championship for Makes. After switch co-drivers in 1974, he was now partnered by Andrea da Adamich. This resulted in him visiting the podium on four occasions, the best being second in the 1000 km Österreichring. By the end of the season, Autodelta had finished fourth in the overall standing, but Facetti collaboration with Alfa Romeo was over, after winning the Italian title. "[He] was going through a period of crisis: [he] worked a lot with little satisfaction on a personal level. However, [he] won the Italian title, but that does not stop [him] from leaving Autodelta. As [he] ran at the Mugello Circuit, Cesare Fiorio tells [him], 'I have to tell you about an interesting program… A few days later, [he] was in Fiorio office, offered [him] the development of the engine for the Stratos. [He] would be working with Mike Parkes, to give the engine fuel injection and 4-valve head."

1974 Italian Grand Prix

He tried to qualify for the Gran Premio d'Italia in a Scuderia Finotto prepared Brabham-Cosworth BT42. He was entered in the place of Helmuth Koinigg, but neither driver, despite their best efforts were simply not enough to qualify the car. But there was some mystery surrounding Facetti entry for Monza. With Facetti already due in the car for the meeting, an entry was provisionally received for Jean-Louis Lafosse, but reject by the organizers, leaving the team to tend the No.31 Brabham of Facetti.

Lancia Stratos

Facetti between 1975 and 1976, was a racer and designer for Lancia, participating in the European Championship for Grand Touring cars. While Facetti immediately begins working on a 24-valve version of the Dino V6 engine, he was racing them. He was leading the Giro d'Italia Automobilistico when he retired with Gearbox problems. "They were three Stratros on the Giro that year; a turbo-charged 2-valve carburetor for Munari, a Pinto and [his] 4 valves with indirect injectons. [He] retired because [he] was too stressed keeping the engine level with the much more powerful Alfa Romeo Tipo 33 prototype of Jean-Claude Andruet". Although the Frenchman retired before Facetti, his Statros was out of the fight really battered… "In Casale, in a final step before arrival, broke a connecting rod first, then infill the injection pump and finally fire!"

1976 saw the arrival of Silhouette, of Group 5 "Special Production Car" category. With it, Lancia switched to the World Championship for Makes, and accepted the challenge from Porsche who took their monstrous 935 Turbo and BMW, with their reliable 3.5 CSL using the Lancia Stratos Turbo, prepared by Facetti, under the supervision of Parkes. The Stratos was not up to the challenge and following the death of Parkes in August 1977, the collaboration between Facetti and Lancia ended, along with the Silhouette program. His last commitment for Lancia saw him win the Giro d'Italia, with the Silhouette version.

Return to the ETCC

For the following season, Facetti successfully returned to the ETCC with a new partner, Martino Finotto, and a new car, BMW 3.0 CSL, while participating in the selection of World Championship Group 5 races, in a Porsche 935. The new partnership started with a podium finish in the 1977 24 Hours of Daytona. Despite having to drive their Jolly Club entered Porsche 935 very carefully and with low boost from the start, they did finish second, as well winning their class.

The returning to the ETCC was a winning one. In Finotto's ex-Luigi BMW form the previous season, and joined by Umberto Grano for the season opener at Monza, the all-Italian were the only contender for victory once the work-supported Jaguars and Alpina BMWs had retired. This trio followed this was second place at Mugello, albeit three laps behind another Luigi BMW. This result promoted Facetti into the lead of the drivers' championship. The Enna round was Grano dropped, but Facetti and Finotto lead the 500 km race from start to finish, leading home the clear sweep of the podium by the BMW CSLs of Luigi Racing.

A trip to Czechoslovakia, saw Facetti/Finotto triumph once again, beating the more fancied teams for the third time in five rounds. This after their BMW had survived an engine rebuild following qualifying, helping Facetti move clear in the championship, with Finotto being his nearest rival! After a number non-finishes, the pairing took third place at Jarama in Spain, and lost the lead in the title race to Dieter Quester. Going into the final round, Facetti was just 11 points behind. This round was held at Estoril, dominated by the changeable weather. As early leader, Grano (now racing for Alpina BMW) faltered, Facetti took his CSL past in the final few minutes of the four-hour race, and scored another win for himself and his partner, Finotto. Grano's second place with his partner, Quester secured the Austrian the championship by just six points.

For 1978, Finotto had brought the Alpina BMW CSL, and continued to share with Facetti. The first round of the 1978 European Touring Car Championship saw the car arrive at Brands Hatch, although two of the four BMW entered had used the supply of engines in qualifying and therefore did not start. The other remaining BMW was quicker in the hand of Grano and Tom Walkinshaw, but due to poor pit by the BMW Italia crew, Facetti/Finotto were able leading until three laps from the end, when Walkinshaw took over the lead. Fresh from their second place in England, Facetti/Finotto were only challenged by their tyres in the four hours event at Monza, eventually winning by seven laps.

In the Mugello race, Facetti and John Fitzpatrick diced the lead in the early stages of the race, only for the Englishman to dropped away when his gearlever came loose. Facetti continued in the lead until Fitzpatrick retook it during a tyre stop. Soon afterwards, the car began to overheat with Finotto at the wheel and would eventually record a DNF. Facetti/Finotto soon returned to their winning ways when they took victory in the Austria-Trophäe, held at the Salzburgring. Facetti's pole lap was over a second faster by Gunnar Nilsson's time set the previous season set in the same car, albeit with an engine revised by Facetti with some 'Italian parts'.

After coming fifth at Jarama, Facetti suffered more bad luck in Estoril with a slipping clutch. As a result, saw Facetti/Finotto lose the championship lead. They retire with fuel feed problems on the Österreichring. But, returned to winning way when the series visited Czechoslovakia, when they trashed the opposition, finishing over an 11 km lap ahead of series leader, Grano. When the pair suffered an engine failure on the Nürburgring, they left the series only to return again in 1979.

After taking pole position for the 1979 6 Ore di Mugello in the 935, Facetti lead the race until a collision and he wound up in third at the end. After this WCM outing, Facetti returned to ETCC at Vallelunga. After 300 of the 500 km, Facetti/Finotto were amongst the leading BMWs, when Finotto pitted with boiling radiator; only moments later Eddy Joosen pitted with exactly the same problem. Repairs were made and both BMWs were back at full pace. At the end of 500 km, Facetti/Finotto were only 9 seconds behind the winners Bruno Giacomelli/Grano/Joosen. The next ETCC race at Mugello, once again was a battle between the BMWs. Although the result was the same as before the margin of victory was down in just 2.6 seconds.

Facetti/Finotto had a dramatic time at Brands Hatch, when they lost the lead of the 500 km race. They were comfortably head of the field for 100 of the 120 laps, when the gear level broke in their old BMW CSL. After quick repairs, Facetti set off desperately to regain ground loss to the rival Luigi BMW. Just a few laps, he had a patch of oil and shot into the catch fencing surrounding the track. Another retirement at the next race, Jarama, this time due fuel feed problems. Their third DNF in a row was down the issues with the cooling system at Österreichring

Main rival for the 1979 title was Grano (Luigi BMW), and while he and Facetti/Finotto both suffered from blown head gaskets at Brno, the green Jolly Club BMW could salvage the car to second place the end of the race. The trip to the Nürburgring, saw the first time this season, the pair won a race after they took pole as well. Next on the ETCC agenda was Zandvoort, which saw the Jolly Club pairing head another BMW 1-2 finish. The BMW dominated the race at Salzburgring, taking all the steps of the podium, with Facetti/Finotto on the number one step, completing a hat-trick of victories.

When the ETCC visited Enna, once again it was a BMW festival, with a podium clean sweep, and after a spin by Finotto, the order was decided with the Jolly Club car in second. They went one better at Silverstone, by winning the RAC Tourist Trophy, with it the European Touring Car title. Their winning ways continued at Zolder, the pairs fifth victory in the last six races.

World Sportscars

By 1980, Facetti was in change at Achille Motors in Milan. This was a business venture with long-time racing partner Finotto. And that year, Lancia sold Finotto one of their brand new Lancia Beta Montecarlo Turbo the factory had been running in the World Championship Group 5, together Facetti and Finotto were able to add points the marque's total. For the 1981, they came up with idea of trying the challenge Porsche with a Ferrari.

With Maranello, only interested in Formula One, Facetti and Finotto decided to take on all-conquering Porsche 935s, even though their facilities at Archille Motors was hardly equal to Porsches. They chose the 3.0 liter Ferrari 308 GTB as their base model. As Group 5 was a Silhouette formula, Facetti know he could change a lot of things provided the car looked like the standard road version. This car they called Carma FF {CARlo Facetti and Martino Finotto and the FF for Facetti and Finotto}.

The standard 308 GTB was not in the same league as a 935, so Facetti designed his own cylinder heads and added two tugrochargers, and ended up with 700 bhp. He also threw away the front and rear subframes and went to Giorgio Stirano, who ran Alba Engineering to build lighter subframes that were merged with the Ferrari center tub. When the car arrive at 24 Hours of Daytona, the car looked like a real Italian special. In conversation, Facetti believed he would be able to turn up the boost in qualifying and get 840 bhp. Is he did, always the brave and gritty driver, putting the Ferrari sixth on the grid.

Facetti and Finotto also entered themselves as driver in their Lancia Beta Turbo, as they intended to race both cars over the 24 hours. It was not necessary, for Facetti drove the Carma flat out, setting the fastest lap in the race, before pitting after only five laps to retire with a cracked manifold and failed electrics. When the car next appeared at Mugello, they were in sixth place when the electric failed again. While at Monza, Facetti put the Carma FF on pole, only for the fuel pump pack up on the warm-up lap and they were out. A gearbox failure accounted for their DNF at Silverstone.

Only Facetti could wring a performance out of the car, that Finotto could not, yet both driver would have fear a trip to the Nürburgring. To no surprise, when Facetti completely lost it and crashed on the Nordschleife. The car appeared twice more. It was on pole at Enna, only to retire after three laps. Finally to the Kyalami Nine Hour race, it once again expired after being second fastest in practice.

For 1982, Facetti and Finotto decided against returning with the Carma and its twin-turbo 308 experiment, instead opting for more conventional Osella-BMW PA9, but equally unsuccessful as they failed to finish a race in the car that season.

1983 saw the introduction of a new category into World Sportscars, Group C Junior. As Facetti and Finotto knew they could not complete on level terms with the might of Porsche, Finotto commissioned Stirano to build a car to these new regulations, while Facetti designed and built a 1.8 litre, four-cylinder turbocharged engine. Since power units had to be ascribed to a recognised manufacturer, the team became known as Giannini-Alba, then Carma FF from 1985. The first car, Alba AR2 was a regular class winner with Facetti and Finotto at the helm in 1983, helping Alba to win the Group C Junior Cup. By 1984, this pairing were winless but still assisted Alba to win the Group C2 Prototype FIA Cup.

The Alba AR6 continued to use Facetti's engine for the 1985 season, the team lost reliability with it, trying to keep up with pace-setter Gordon Spice, Finotto turned his attention to the IMSA Camel Lights category in America for 1986. Finotto and Facetti, who prepared the overhead camshaft Ferrari  engines, joined forces with Gaston Andrey Racing and enrolled fellow Italian, Ruggero Melgrati, who proved to be pace-setter in the Lights division. The team rarely enjoyed reliability to match, but Melgrati and Facetti shared success at Grand Prix of Palm Beach and Löwenbräu Classic.

Facetti only returned to cockpit of an Alba once more after the season in the US, and that was a non-championship, Kyalami 500 km in 1988. He then retire full-time from International motor sport, albeit bar a one-off outing in a Ferrari F355, where he finished fourth in a round of the Coppa GT Special at Mugello in 1995.

Racing record

Career highlights

Complete Formula One results
(key)

Complete European Formula Two Championship results
(key) (Races in bold indicate pole position; races in italics indicate *fastest lap)

Complete British Saloon Car Championship results
(key) (Races in bold indicate pole position; races in italics indicate fastest lap.)

† Events with 2 races staged for the different classes.

Complete 24 Hours of Le Mans results

Complete 24 Hours of Daytona results

Complete 12 Hours of Sebring results

Complete 24 Hours of Spa results

Complete Mil Milhas Brasil results

References

1935 births
Living people
Italian racing drivers
Italian Formula One drivers
24 Hours of Le Mans drivers
24 Hours of Daytona drivers
12 Hours of Sebring drivers
24 Hours of Spa drivers
Silvio Moser Racing Team Formula One drivers
World Sportscar Championship drivers
European Touring Car Championship drivers
IMSA GT Championship drivers